Chennai Slam was an UBA Pro Basketball League franchise based in Chennai, Tamil Nadu which began to play in 2015. They were the only team who has won the league twice.

History
On 17 July 2015 at Gachibowli Indoor Stadium, Chennai Slam start their first UBA Pro Basketball League with a 65–61 loss to Hyderabad Sky, but made a comeback with four victories. The team finished its 6-game regular season in second place in the division.

In the semifinals, Chennai Slam won over Punjab Steelers 92–77. They won the first season of the UBA Pro Basketball League by beating Pune Peshwas 81–49 in the finals.

Players
Chennai Slam season 4 roster

Basketball teams established in 2015
Basketball teams in India
Basketball in Chennai
Basketball in Tamil Nadu